Red Bluff is a city in and the county seat of Tehama County, California, United States. The population was 14,710 at the 2020 census, up from 14,076 at the 2010 census.

Red Bluff is situated on the banks of the upper Sacramento River.

It was originally known as Leodocia, but was renamed to Covertsburg in 1853. It got its current name in 1854. Located at the head of navigation on the Sacramento River the town flourished in the mid to late 19th century as a landing point for miners heading to the Trinity County gold fields and later as a temporary terminus for the Southern Pacific Railroad's northward expansion.

Geography 

Red Bluff is on the northern edge of the Sacramento Valley, and is the third largest city in the Shasta Cascade region.

The city is located at  (40.176640, -122.237951). The total area is 1.48% water.

History 

In the early 19th century the Siskiyou Trail was the main north to south path connecting Northern California and Southern Oregon first used by the Native Americans and later fur trappers and hunters. The first European to settle the northern Sacramento Valley in what was then Alta California was Peter Lassen who in 1844 was granted the 24,000 acre Rancho Bosquejo tract from the Mexican government near present-day Vina, about 20 miles southeast of Red Bluff. There he proposed to establish a town but his attempts were thwarted when the California Gold Rush stole the focus of the settlers he had gathered in Missouri. Regardless, the publicity from his colonization efforts attracted new settlers to the valley. In the late 1840s riverboat traffic began expanding northward along the Sacramento River. Lassen's initial attempt to navigate to his ranch in 1849 had failed but the following year a riverboat managed to make the arduous 125-mile journey from Sacramento in 5 months before ultimately being sunk. The discovery of gold near Yreka, California in 1851 brought a new rush northward and settlers soon flooded the area, looking for the quickest route to the gold fields. A site on the Sacramento River just north of Reeds Creek was determined to be the river's navigable head and a small community soon sprung up around the important landing. First known as Leodocia then Covertsburg, by then time a post office was established on October 17, 1853, residents had settled on the name Red Bluff, in recognition of the titular geographical features once prominent along the banks of the Sacramento River. The first postmaster was Samuel Bishop.

Tehama County was created in 1856 and Red Bluff was chosen as the new county's seat. By 1859 the first permanent courthouse was constructed.

As early as 1854, committees were brought together at Red Bluff to plan a railroad route connecting California to southern Oregon through the Siskyou Mountains via Nobles Pass. The railroad finally reached Red Bluff in 1872 and for a few years it was the terminus, increasing the town's wealth greatly. In the 1880s white supremacists in Red Bluff began an ethnic cleansing campaign against the Chinese residents. In February 1886 thousands of whites in the "Anti-Coolie League" marched on Chinatown and went from house to house, ordering the occupants to leave within ten days. Later that year, after the Chinese population had been expelled, the Chinatown was burned.

Growth slowed by the late 1880s when the railroad was continued north towards Redding but river boat commerce continued well into the 20th century. Mining was largely replaced by agriculture and Red Bluff remained a vital shipping point by rail and eventually highway.

In June 2020, a local Walmart distribution center was the site of a workplace shooting, in which an employee was killed and another four injured. The shooter, identified as a former employee at the distribution center, was then killed by responding police officers.

Climate 

Red Bluff has a Mediterranean climate (Csa) with cool, wet winters and hot, dry summers. Annual precipitation averages  with measurable precipitation falling on an average of 71 days.

Demographics

2010 

At the 2010 census Red Bluff had a population of 14,076. The racial makeup of Red Bluff was 11,366 (80.7%) White, 128 (0.9%) African American, 438 (3.1%) Native American, 187 (1.3%) Asian, 16 (0.1%) Pacific Islander, 1,168 (8.3%) from other races, and 773 (5.5%) from two or more races. Hispanic or Latino of any race were 3,037 persons (21.6%).

The census reported that 13,637 people (96.9% of the population) lived in households, 150 (1.1%) lived in non-institutionalized group quarters, and 289 (2.1%) were institutionalized.

There were 5,376 households, 2,033 (37.8%) had children under the age of 18 living in them, 1,969 (36.6%) were opposite-sex married couples living together, 1,022 (19.0%) had a female householder with no husband present, 404 (7.5%) had a male householder with no wife present. There were 537 (10.0%) unmarried opposite-sex partnerships, and 27 (0.5%) same-sex married couples or partnerships. 1,629 households (30.3%) were one person and 678 (12.6%) had someone living alone who was 65 or older. The average household size was 2.54. There were 3,395 families (63.2% of households); the average family size was 3.11.

The age distribution was 3,950 people (28.1%) under the age of 18, 1,534 people (10.9%) aged 18 to 24, 3,561 people (25.3%) aged 25 to 44, 3,157 people (22.4%) aged 45 to 64, and 1,874 people (13.3%) who were 65 or older. The median age was 32.2 years. For every 100 females, there were 92.4 males. For every 100 females age 18 and over, there were 87.7 males.

There were 5,872 housing units at an average density of 764.9 per square mile, of the occupied units 2,277 (42.4%) were owner-occupied and 3,099 (57.6%) were rented. The homeowner vacancy rate was 3.5%; the rental vacancy rate was 7.3%. 5,652 people (40.2% of the population) lived in owner-occupied housing units and 7,985 people (56.7%) lived in rental housing units.

2000 
At the 2000 census there were 13,147 people in 5,109 households, including 3,239 families, in the city. The racial makeup of the city was 86.7% White, 0.6% Black, 2.2% Native American, 1.6% Asian, 0.1% Pacific Islander, 5.8% from other races, and 3.0% from two or more races. Hispanic or Latino of any race were 13.7%.

Of the 5,109 households 36.2% had children under the age of 18 living with them, 42.4% were married couples living together, 16.5% had a female householder with no husband present, and 36.6% were non-families. 30.7% of households were one person and 14.0% were one person aged 65 or older. The average household size was 2.47 and the average family size was 3.07.

The age distribution was 28.7% under the age of 18, 9.9% from 18 to 24, 28.6% from 25 to 44, 18.0% from 45 to 64, and 14.7% 65 or older. The median age was 34 years. For every 100 females, there were 90.1 males. For every 100 females age 18 and over, there were 84.1 males.

The median income for a household in the city was $27,029, and the median family income was $32,799. Males had a median income of $26,807 versus $21,048 for females. The per capita income for the city was $14,060. About 17.7% of families and 21.1% of the population were below the poverty line, including 29.6% of those under age 18 and 9.7% of those age 65 or over.

Top employers 

According to the city's 2016 Comprehensive Annual Financial Report (CAFR), these are the top-10 employers:

Events 

 The annual Red Bluff Round-Up, first held in 1921, has become one of the west's largest rodeos. The town is well known throughout the nation due to its popular bull competitions.
 TehamaPulse.com is an online events calendar for Tehama County, including Red Bluff.

News 

 Red Bluff's Little League 11–12 year old All-Star baseball team was the Northern California State Champions and the runner up in the 2011 Little League All-Star west region. The team played twice on television, ESPN and ESPN 2. After the tournament the team was honored by the San Francisco Giants for winning the Northern California Championship.
 Red Bluff's Little League 9-10 year old All-Star baseball team placed fourth in the state of California in the 2002 California Little League All-Star tournament
 Red Bluff's Little League 11–12 year old All-Star baseball team was the United States Little League Champion and the runner-up in the 1974 Little League World Series
 On April 30, 1984, the Cone & Kimball building in downtown Red Bluff burned down. A park with a new clock tower was built on its lot in 2007.
 In late 1984, it was discovered that Colleen Stan had been kept as a sex slave on Weed Court since 1977, without anyone outside her abductors household knowing
 On November 19, 2002, Andrew Mickel shot and killed Officer David Mobilio of the Red Bluff Police Department in an attempt to make a political statement against "corporate irresponsibility" and the government's "police-state tactics". The case brought national media attention to Red Bluff.
 On November 14, 2017, Saint Elizabeth Community Hospital in Red Bluff treated several victims of the Rancho Tehama shootings

Newspapers 

 Red Bluff Daily News
 The Redding Record Searchlight runs a weekly publication called Tehama Today for Red Bluff residents. It is included in the Sunday editions of the Record Searchlight.

Notable people 

 Clancy Barone, offensive line coach for the National Football League
 Mary Brown, widow of John Brown the Abolitionist, and her family lived in Red Bluff from 1864 until 1870. Her house at 135 Main Street, built for her by the citizens of Red Bluff, is a state historic landmark. When Speaker of the U.S. House of Representatives Schuyler Colfax passed through Red Bluff in 1865, Mary Brown and her daughters are the only persons mentioned.
 Chuck Cecil, former National Football League safety
 Michael Chiarello, celebrity chef
 Jim Davis, Major League Baseball pitcher for the Giants, Cubs and Cardinals. In 1956, he became the first pitcher in 40 years to record four strikeouts in a single inning
 Shane Drake, award-winning music video director
 Clair Engle, former United States Senator, was known as "The Pride of Red Bluff"
 Jesse Freitas Sr., American football player.
 Al Geiberger, 1966 PGA Championship winner, was born here
 Gale Gilbert, NFL quarterback
 Margaret Glaspy, Singer-Songwriter
 Leo Gorcey, stage and movie actor
 Marv Grissom, Major League Baseball player
 Jim Hanks, voice and character actor (brother of Tom Hanks)
 William B. Ide, who joined the Bear Flag Revolt and was named President of the California Republic
 Roy Joiner, Major League Baseball pitcher of 1930s
 Bill Redell, former Occidental College quarterback and College Football Hall of Fame member
 Swede Risberg, baseball player banned after Black Sox Scandal, died in Red Bluff
 Jeff Serr, radio personality and voice actor
 Robert Shaw, choral conductor

References

External links 

 
 
 Red Bluff Union High School
 Red Bluff Police Department

 
1876 establishments in California
Cities in Tehama County, California
County seats in California
Geography of the Sacramento Valley
Incorporated cities and towns in California
Populated places established in 1876
Populated places on the Sacramento River
Shasta Cascade